Bentley Springer (born 19 November 1979) is a Barbadian footballer who currently plays for the Weymouth Wales as a goalkeeper.

Career
He played for the Technico and Weymouth Wales. He made his international debut for Barbados in 2008, and appeared in FIFA World Cup qualifying matches.

References

External links
Player profile - Footballdatabase.eu

1979 births
Living people
Association football goalkeepers
Barbadian footballers
Barbados international footballers
Weymouth Wales FC players